Casphalia elegans is a moth species in the genus Casphalia found in Ghana.

References

External links 

Endemic fauna of Ghana
Limacodidae
Moths described in 1915
Insects of West Africa
Moths of Africa